Unity Bank, also known as Unity Bank plc, is a commercial bank in Nigeria.

Overview
Unity Bank is a large financial services provider in Nigeria. Headquartered in Lagos, Nigeria's commercial capital. Unity Bank also maintains an operations base in Abuja, Nigeria's capital. , the bank's total assets were valued at about US$2.45 billion (NGN:396 billion), with shareholders' equity of approximately US$322 million (NGN:51.5 billion).

History
In January 2006, nine financial institutions with expertise in corporate banking, retail banking, as well as investment banking, came together to form Unity Bank plc.

Unity Bank Group
Unity Bank plc, is the flagship institution of the Unity Bank Group. Other members of the financial services group include the following:

 Unity Capital & Trust Limited
 Caranda Management Services Limited
 Unity Registrars Limited
 Northlink Insurance Brokers Limited
 Newdevco Investments & Securities Limited
 UnityKapital Assurance plc
 Pelican Prints Limited
 Unity Bank BDC
 Hexali Properties Limited

Ownership
The shares of stock of Unity Bank plc are listed on the Nigerian Stock Exchange, where they trade under the symbol: UNITYBNK. The detailed shareholding in the bank is not publicly available at this time.

Branch network
 Unity Bank plc maintained 242 branches across all states of Nigeria, giving it the 7th-largest branch network in the country. Another 25 branches were planned at that time.

See also
List of banks in Nigeria
Economy of Nigeria

References

External links
Homepage of Unity Bank Nigeria
Website of Central Bank of Nigeria

Banks of Nigeria
Banks established in 2006